Kasseri or Kaşar (Greek: κασέρι, Turkish: kaşar) is a medium-hard or hard pale yellow cheese made from pasteurised or unpasteurised sheep milk and at most 20% goat's milk. "Kasseri" is a protected designation of origin, according to which the cheese must be made in the Greek provinces of Thessaly, Macedonia, Lesbos, or Xanthi, but a similar type of cheese is found in Turkey, Romania, and the Balkans, where it is known as kashkaval. The same cheese is made with cow's milk, but in that case it cannot be legally sold as "kasseri" in the EU and is instead sold under names that are particular to each producer.

Kasseri is of semi-hard to hard consistency, smooth rather than crumbly, chewy, and with a hard rind. It belongs to the pasta filata family of cheeses, which includes fresh cheeses like mozzarella and aged ones like Provolone or Caciocavallo. Once the curd has set, it is divided into pieces about the size of a maize cob and then cooked at  while stirring. Afterwards, the curd is transferred to draining tables where it is ground to small pieces by hand, tightly bound in cheesecloth, topped with a small weight, and left to drain and ferment until its pH is about 5.2. The kneaded cheese mass is salted and then put into molds for two or three days.

The name kasseri comes from Turkish kaşer, which in turn comes from Hebrew כָּשֵׁר (kosher). The lack of use of rennet during its invention by the Jews of Kırkkilise (modern Kırklareli, Turkey) made the cheese fit for the requirements of the Jewish law.

Kasseri is consumed in sandwiches as the main constituent in kasseropita and saganaki.

Assyrians use Kasseri cheese to make a traditional Assyrian cheese dish, called "Gupta Tomirta," ܓܘܒܬܐ ܜܘܡܪܬܐ  ("buried cheese"), that is topped with cumin and sometimes other seasonings.

See also

 Assyrian cuisine
 Cuisine of Cyprus
 Greek cuisine
 Greek food products
 Kashkaval
 Turkish cuisine

References

Greek products with protected designation of origin
Greek cheeses
Sheep's-milk cheeses
Goat's-milk cheeses
Cheeses with designation of origin protected in the European Union
Greek Macedonian cuisine